{{Speciesbox
| image = Echineulima mittrei (MNHN-IM-2000-5670).jpeg
| image_caption = Shell of Echineulima mittrei (syntype at MNHN, Paris)
| taxon = Echineulima mittrei
| authority = Petit de la Saussaye, 1851
| synonyms_ref = 
| synonyms = 
 Echineulima apiculatus  Souverbie, 1862 
 Echineulima dubius  Baird, 1873 
 Echineulima eburneus  Deshayes, 1863 
 Echineulima tokiokai  Habe, 1952 
 Stilifer mittrei  Habe, 1952 
 Stylifer apiculatus  Souverbie, 1862 
 Stylifer dubius  Baird, 1873 
 Stylifer eburneus  Deshayes, 1863 
}}Echineulima mittrei'' is a species of sea snail, a marine gastropod mollusk in the family Eulimidae.

Distribution
This marine species occurs in the following locations:

 European waters (ERMS scope)

References

External links
 To World Register of Marine Species

Eulimidae
Gastropods described in 1851